General elections were held in Trinidad and Tobago on 11 December 2000. The result was a victory for the United National Congress, which won 19 of the 36 seats. Voter turnout was 63.1%.

Results

References

Trinidad
Elections in Trinidad and Tobago
2000 in Trinidad and Tobago